Denglong Township is a township under the administration of Ji'an County, Jiangxi, China. , it administers Longgang Residential Community and the following 15 villages:
Longgang Village
Tianxin Village
Pantang Village
Guojia Village
Miaoqian Village
Tangbian Village
Dongtou Village
Xiangkou Village
Qingjiang Village
Langshi Village
Gaoyuan Village
Sitang Village
Mutang Village
Huangpi Village
Qingshan Village

References 

Township-level divisions of Jiangxi
Ji'an